Sabuj Dwiper Raja is a 1979 Indian adventure thriller film directed by Tapan Sinha, based on the same name novel of Kakababu by Sunil Gangopadhyay.

Synopsis
A criminal gang led by notorious smuggler Panja is set to steal a secret source of energy that emanates from a meteorite that has landed on a remote area of Andaman Islands. They know that the local tribe jarwas have no idea of its value. A patriot, Mr. Gunada Talukdar, flees from the notorious Cellular Jail during the British Raj. He reaches the island and is later chosen as King of the tribals.

Thirteen-year-old Santu joins his uncle Raja Roychoudhury alias Kakababu who is sent on behalf of the Intelligence to survey the island. The two leave Calcutta by ship for the Andaman Islands. Santu's sharp eye soon detects that the criminals are on board. Santu is instrumental in helping his uncle prevent the dastardly plot the criminals are about to carry out. Kakababu and Santu went to the alienated island of Jarawas ignoring the government restrictions. 

In the meantime Panja and his henchmen were captured by Jarwas while they were trying to steal the power energy. Kakababu recognised the leader of jarwa, the old man as Mr. Talukdar, and after a short fight with Panja's gang they returned to the mainland with the help of police.

Cast
Samit Bhanja as Kakababu
Arunava Adhikari as Shantu
Lily Chakravarty as Shontu's Mother
Biplab Chatterjee as Kalla
Rabi Ghosh as Gute da
Nirmal Kumar as Superintendent of Police
Kalyan Chatterjee
Arun Mukherjee
Ramen Roy Chowdhury
Asim Dutta
Debatosh Ghosh
Nipu Mitra

Reception
Although questionable on the ground of showing the Jarawa tribal-folk just as the colonial British government would specifically mark out the then resident Indian population-groups as uncivilized, belligerent sub-human 'natives', the film gained considerable popularity by synthesizing educative knowledge-bits for young filmgoers (and their parents), exotic adventure and patriotism.

References

External links
Sabuj Dwiper Raja at Gomolo
Sabuj Dwiper Raja at the Internet Movie Database

1973 films
1970s adventure thriller films
Indian children's films
Bengali-language Indian films
Films based on Indian novels
1970s Bengali-language films
Films based on works by Sunil Gangopadhyay
Films set in the Andaman and Nicobar Islands
Films about kings